Phyllodonta is a genus of moths in the family Geometridae described by Warren in 1894.

Species
Phyllodonta alajuela Sullivan, 2014
Phyllodonta anca Dognin, 1901
Phyllodonta angulosa (Stoll, 1781)
Phyllodonta caninata (Guenée, 1857)
Phyllodonta cataphracta Prout, 1931
Phyllodonta decisaria (Herrich-Schäffer, 1870)
Phyllodonta druciata Schaus, 1901
Phyllodonta esperanza Sullivan, 2014
Phyllodonta flabellaria (Thierry-Mieg, 1894)
Phyllodonta flexilinea (Warren, 1904)
Phyllodonta furcata Warren, 1894
Phyllodonta indeterminata Schaus, 1901
Phyllodonta inexcisa Dognin, 1908
Phyllodonta informis Warren, 1894
Phyllodonta intermediata Sullivan, 2014
Phyllodonta latrata (Guenée, 1857)
Phyllodonta matalia (Druce, 1891)
Phyllodonta muscilinea Dognin, 1911
Phyllodonta obscura Dognin, 1904
Phyllodonta peccataria (Barnes & McDunnough, 1916)
Phyllodonta sarukhani Beutelspacher, 1984
Phyllodonta semicava Warren, 1904
Phyllodonta songaria Dognin, 1901
Phyllodonta succedens (Walker, 1860)
Phyllodonta timareta (Druce, 1898)
Phyllodonta ustanalis Warren, 1897
Phyllodonta vivida Warren, 1904

References

 2014: The Phyllodonta latrata (Guenée) species group in Costa Rica (Geometridae, Ennominae). ZooKeys, 421: 3-19. 

Ourapterygini